Redefin is a municipality  in the Ludwigslust-Parchim district, in Mecklenburg-Vorpommern, Germany.

Redefin is mostly known because of the state stud farm (Landgestüt) of Mecklenburg-Vorpommern, which was founded in 1812.

References

Ludwigslust-Parchim